Dicrastylis archeri is a species of plant within the genus, Dicrastylis, in the family Lamiaceae.  It is endemic to the south-west of Western Australia.

Description
Dicrastylis archeri is an erect, spindly shrub, growing from 40 cm up to 1 m high. Its stems are roughly circular in cross section. The opposite and entire leaves are 20–50 mm long by 3–5 mm wide, and have branched (dendritic) hairs, and a blistered, puckered surface. There are no bracteoles, but there are bracts which are 3.5-5. mm long. The stalks of the flowers are 2.5–5 mm long, and have both simple hairs and peltate scales. The calyx has five lobes (1-1.5 mm long), and are covered in dendritic hairs.  and the white or cream corolla is 4-4.5 mm long, with no dots or stripes in its throat. There are four (five) stamens. Flowers may be seen in November or December.

It is found in the IBRA region of Mallee.

Taxonomy
It was first described by Ahmad Abid Munir in 1978 as Dicrastylis archeri. There are no synonyms.

References

archeri
Eudicots of Western Australia
Endemic flora of Western Australia
Plants described in 1991